IRB  may refer to:

Organizations
 Immigration and Refugee Board of Canada, a Canadian administrative tribunal
 Indian Reserve Battalion, a special unit of the Indian Police Force
 Institut Ruđer Bošković (Ruđer Bošković Institute), a Croatian research institute
 Institutional review board, a committee to monitor research involving humans
 Instituto de Resseguros do Brasil, a Brazilian reinsurance company
 Instituto Ricardo Brennand, a museum in Recife, Brazil
 International Rugby Board, the former name of World Rugby, the governing board of rugby union
 IRB Infrastructure, an Indian road infrastructure company
 Irish Republican Brotherhood, an Irish secret revolutionary society of the 19th and early 20th centuries

Technology
 Interactive Ruby Shell, a shell for programming in Ruby
 ASEA IRB, a line of industrial robots

Other
 Inflatable rescue boat, a rubber boat with an outboard motor used in surf lifesaving
 IRB racing
 Internal ratings-based approach (credit risk), a method for estimating bank capital requirements
 Internal Revenue Bulletin, a weekly publication of the U.S. Internal Revenue Service
 Internal Ratings Based approach, a method of assessing Bank capital requirements
 Ian Rank-Broadley, British sculptor and designer of the fourth coinage portrait of Elizabeth II